The Ontario Minor Hockey Association (OMHA) is a minor ice hockey governing body in Ontario. The OMHA is sanctioned by the Ontario Hockey Federation and Hockey Canada.

History
The OMHA was founded on November 30, 1940, after a merger of the Ontario Juvenile Hockey Association and the Ontario Midget and Bantam Hockey Association, arranged by Jack Roxburgh. The new league began its first season with eight teams, and signed an affiliation agreement with the Ontario Hockey Association (OHA).

During the summer in 1989, the Metro Toronto Hockey League (MTHL) and the OMHA, broke away from the OHA and formed the Central Canada Hockey Association, due to disagreement with an OHA restructuring proposal which would have limited their voting powers. The dispute ended when the Ontario Hockey Federation (OHF) was established, with equal representation for the OHA, Northern Ontario Hockey Association, MTHL, and OMHA. The OHF was given the mandate to oversee hockey in Ontario, and be a review panel for three years to propose further restructuring if necessary.

Structure
There are two "AAA" leagues, the Eastern AAA Hockey League and the South-Central Triple A Hockey League as well as four "AA" leagues in the York-Simcoe AA League, Tri-County AA League, Lakeshore League and the Bluewater League.  The OMHA also has six "A" leagues in the Bluewater League, Niagara District League, Tri-County A League, York-Simcoe A League and the Lakeshore League.

The OMHA also has several representative leagues from the BB-E representative classifications such as the Shamrock League, Georgian Bay-Muskoka League, Southern Counties League, Western Ontario Athletic Association, Victoria Durham League and the Eastern Ontario League.

References

External links
OMHA web site

Ice hockey governing bodies in Ontario
Youth ice hockey in Canada
Sports organizations established in 1935